Gari lineolata, or the pink sunset shell, is a bivalve mollusc of the family Psammobiidae.

References
 Powell A. W. B., New Zealand Mollusca, William Collins Publishers Ltd, Auckland, New Zealand 1979 
 Glen Pownall, New Zealand Shells and Shellfish, Seven Seas Publishing Pty Ltd, Wellington, New Zealand 1979 

Psammobiidae
Bivalves of New Zealand
Bivalves described in 1835